The Davenport Historic District is a U.S. historic district (designated as such on August 15, 1997) located in Davenport, Florida. The district is bounded by Suwannee and Orange Avenues, Palmento Street, and West Boulevard. It contains 28 historic buildings and 1 structure.

Gallery

References

External links
 Polk County listings at National Register of Historic Places

National Register of Historic Places in Polk County, Florida
Historic districts on the National Register of Historic Places in Florida